Bà Lụa Islands is an archipelago located in the Gulf of Thailand. It constitutes Sơn Hải Commune of Kiên Lương District, Kiên Giang Province, Vietnam. The archipelago is known as "(Small) Ha Long of the South".

Etymology
There are several different interpretations to the name of the islands. Some sources explain that Bà Lụa is the Chinese Vietnamese wife of an influential Frenchman coming here to exploit the area; since all of related legal papers were in her name, the islands was named Bà Lụa. Anh Dong (2010) claims that Bà Lụa ("Lady Silk") is the name of a female general in charge of military logistics who established a silk mill on the islands in order to supply Nguyễn Trung Trực's militia force. Another source says that around 1858, a feudal mandarin married a beautiful and gentle wife who wanted to stay away from the officialdom and eventually settled on the islands. Every day she raised silkworms and wove silk, so the islands has been called Bà Lụa ever since.

Geography

The archipelago, formed from lower-mid Paleozoic sedimentary rocks, consists of about 34 (or 42) islands spreading out over a 70-square-kilometer water area, among which Hòn Heo is the largest entity. Apart from Hòn Heo, none of the rest have a highest point exceeding . The most populous islands are Hòn Heo, Hòn Ngang and Hòn Nhum. The sea area around the archipelago is shallow, and in many places, people can even walk from island to island during low tide.

Hòn Heo (literally "Pig Island") is the largest island of Bà Lụa. Its name originates from the fact that the French built a piggery on the island in 1918 (Anh Dong, 2010). Here lies the People's Committee Head Office of Son Hai Commune.

Incomplete list of islands

Administrative history
 On 14 January 1983, Kiên Hải District was formed with six communes including Bà Lụa Commune that administered Bà Lụa Islands.
 On 27 September 1983, Bà Lụa Commune was renamed to Sơn Hải Commune (Kiên Hải District).
 Since 17 August 2000, Sơn Hải Commune has been under the administration of Kiên Lương District.

See also
 Nam Du Islands

References

Bibliography

External links

 Cruising Ba Lua Archipelago, 31 August 2011, Saigon Times Online
 Satellite image of Hòn Heo (Bà Lụa Islands), Google Maps

Archipelagoes of Vietnam
Landforms of Kiên Giang province
Islands of the Gulf of Thailand